Khadijah Ibrahiim is a literary activist, theatre maker and writer from Leeds. She is the founder and artistic director of Leeds Young Authors, and executive producer of the documentary ‘We Are Poets’. She and her work have appeared on BBC Radio 1Xtra, BBC Radio 3 and BBC Radio 4.

Biography 
Ibrahiim is of Jamaican parentage, her politically active grandparents were two of the 5,000 people who came to Leeds in the 1950s. She was born in Leeds and she would meet Jamaican musicians who visited her home. She attended the University of Leeds and has a masters degree in Theatre Studies. She has toured her work in America, Caribbean, Africa and Asia.

Career 
In 2003 she started Leeds Young Authors running workshops in the Chapeltown area of Leeds funded by a small grant from the Arts Council. After a year the money was gone but the enthusiasm remained, so the workers became volunteers.

Ibrahiim attended the Calabash International Literary Festival in Jamaica and she was one of the first international writers to attend the El Gouna Writers Residency in Egypt, 2010.  In the following year she was given the Leeds Black Award 2011 for outstanding contribution to arts. She was one of several poets invited to Buckingham Palace in 2013, where the Queen and Prince Philip honoured the work of contemporary British poetry.

In 2017, she was creative associate for the theatre production Ode To Leeds at the West Yorkshire Playhouse. In 2008 she toured the USA with the Fwords Creative Freedom writers. She produces the Leeds Youth Poetry Slam festival. Ibrahiim's work includes Dead and Wake, part of Connecting Voices, a collaboration between Leeds Playhouse and Opera North in 2020; The Promise of a Garden as associate director of the Performance Ensemble; Sorrel & Black Cake as writer and director with the Geraldine Connor Foundation; Symphonic Dancers, as writer and poet for Phoenix Dance. In 2019 Ibrahiim and two other poets were commissioned as part of the British Library, Leeds Libraries and Poet in the City collaboration Collections in Verse. She continued her work with the British Library and Leeds Libraries by hosting a spoken word event with Suhaiymah Manzoor-Khan as part of the Unfinished Business: The Fight for Women's Rights project. In 2020 during the COVID-19 pandemic the Geraldine Connor Foundation organised an on-line event to celebrate Windrush Day. The event was hosted by Ibrahiim and academic Emily Zobel Marshall. Guests were the writer Colin Grant, the poet Linton Kwesi Johnson, the musician Christella Litras and Camille Quamina from Jamaica.

Ibrahiim's poetry has been published by Peepal Tree Press, which publishes international writing from the Caribbean, its diasporas and the UK.

Her work has appeared in university journals and poetry anthologies and on BBC Radio 4 Radio 3 and BBC Radio 1Xtra.

Publications 
 Voices of Women (Yorkshire Arts, 2003)
 Hair (Suitcase Press, 2006)
 Rootz Runnin (Peepal Tree Press, 2008)
Red: An Anthology of Contemporary Black British Poetry, edited by Kwame Dawes (Peepal Tree Press, 2010)
Out of Bounds: British Black & Asian Poets, edited by Jackie Kay, James Procter, Gemma Robinson (Bloodaxe, 2012)
Another Crossing (Peepal Tree Press, 2014)
The Dreams of Those Who Stay Awake, edited by Khadijah Ibrahiim (First Story Limited, 2019)
The Sea Needs No Ornament: A Bilingual Anthology of Contemporary Caribbean Women Poets, edited by Loretta Collins Klobah, Maria Grau Perejoan (Peepal Tree Press, 2020)
More Fiya: A New Collection of Black British Poetry, edited by Kayo Chingonyi (Canongate, Edinburgh, 2022)

Awards and recognition 
Leeds Black Award 2011

In 2017 and 2019 Ibrahiim was short listed for the Jerwood Compton Poetry Fellowship.

In 2018 she was shortlisted for the Sue Rider ‘Yorkshire Woman of the Year' award for her contribution to the arts.

Private life
Ibrahiim has a daughter Rheima Robinson who is also a poet.

References 

People from Leeds
21st-century British poets
Living people
Year of birth missing (living people)
British women poets